Grant Hayden Kenny OAM (born 14 June 1963) is an Australian former Ironman, surf lifesaver and canoeist.

Career 

Kenny made headlines in 1980 when, as a 16-year-old, he won both the Australian Junior and Open Iron Man Championship on the same day. Kenny then won the Australian Open Ironman Title for the following three years. He also became a household name in Australia due to his sponsorship deals with Kelloggs Nutri-Grain, and appeared in television commercials for the cereal.

After turning his attention to kayaks in the mid-1980s, Kenny later became an important figure in creating the Uncle Toby's Super Series, which was a ground-breaking professional Iron Man circuit that lasted for 12 years. Kenny was also a competitor in the first two seasons, but by 1989 his other interests had taken away the necessary time to train for such a demanding sport and his results were never anything like his domination during his late teens.

In kayaks, Kenny competed in two Summer Olympics.  He won a bronze medal in the K-2 1000 m event with Barry Kelly at Los Angeles in 1984.

Honours 
Kenny is a recipient of the Medal of the Order of Australia, which he received in 1986 for his service to sport. He has also been awarded the Australian Sports Medal in 2000, and the Centenary Medal in 2001, both for his services to the sporting and business world. He was also inducted into the Sport Australia Hall of Fame in 1996.

Personal life 
Kenny was married to the Australian Commonwealth swimming champion Lisa Curry in 1986. They have three children, Jaimi Lee, Morgan and Jett. Curry and Kenny separated in May 2009. Daughter Jaimi Lee Kenny died on 14 September 2020 at age 33, following a long illness, Kenny and his former wife co-own the Curry Kenny Aviation Group, which in 2009 owned approximately 60 aircraft.

On 17 December 2012 it was reported that he was the unknown father of an unborn baby with Australian radio announcer and comedian Fifi Box. Fifi Box later confirmed that Kenny was the father. On 5 April 2013 Fifi Box gave birth to a baby girl named Beatrix 'Trixie' Beater Box.

References

External links
DatabaseOlympics.com profile

Living people
1963 births
Sportspeople from the Sunshine Coast
Australian male canoeists
Canoeists at the 1988 Summer Olympics
Canoeists at the 1984 Summer Olympics
Olympic canoeists of Australia
Olympic bronze medalists for Australia
Australian racing drivers
Recipients of the Medal of the Order of Australia
Recipients of the Centenary Medal
Recipients of the Australian Sports Medal
Sport Australia Hall of Fame inductees
People from Maryborough, Queensland
Sportsmen from Queensland
Olympic medalists in canoeing
Australian surf lifesavers
Medalists at the 1984 Summer Olympics
20th-century Australian people